The Newfound River is a  river in central New Hampshire in the United States.  It is a tributary of the Pemigewasset River, part of the Merrimack River watershed.

The Newfound River begins at the outlet of Newfound Lake in Bristol, New Hampshire.  The river drops rapidly through the town of Bristol, passing over several hydroelectric dams before reaching the Pemigewasset.

Major tributaries of the Newfound River (via Newfound Lake) are the Fowler River and the Cockermouth River.

See also

List of rivers of New Hampshire

References

Tributaries of the Merrimack River
Rivers of New Hampshire
Rivers of Grafton County, New Hampshire